(17 December 1930 – 2 September 2013) was a Japanese composer.

Biography
Makoto Moroi was born in Tokyō, and is the son of Saburō Moroi. He studied composition with Tomojirō Ikenouchi at the Tokyo National University of Fine Arts and Music, graduating in 1952. He also studied Gregorian chant privately with Paul Anouilh, and Renaissance and Baroque music with Eta Harich-Schneider. He was one of the leading composers who introduced Japanese audiences to new musical styles and devices, including twelve-tone technique, serialism, and aleatory music. He was one of the first Japanese composers to embrace electronic music, and also introduced traditional Japanese instruments like the shakuhachi into his compositions. He died, aged 82, on 2 September 2013.

List of works

Opera
 1959 – The Stars of Pythagoras
 1960 – Red Cocoon
 1961 – Die lange, lange Strasse lange
 1962 – Yamauba
 1965 – Phaeton the charioteer

Choral
 1959 – Chamber Cantata No. 1
 1959 – Chamber Cantata No. 2
 1970 – Izumo, my home
 1972 – A romance of playing cards

Orchestral
 1953 – Composition No. 1
 1958 – Composition No. 2
 1958 – Composition No. 3
 1960 – Composition No. 4
 1961 – Ode to Schoenberg
 1966 – The Vision of Cain, symphonic sketch
 1968 – Symphony

Concertante
 1963 – Suite concertante for violin and orchestra
 1964 – Toccata, Sarabande and Tarantella for piano and double string orchestra
 1966 – Piano Concerto No. 1
 1968 – Three Movements for shakuhachi, strings and percussion
 1971 – Piano Concerto No. 2
 1973 – Kyoso Symphony, for folk instruments and orchestra

Chamber
 1950 – Chamber Music No. 1
 1950 – Chamber Music No. 2
 1951 – Chamber Music No. 3
 1954 – Chamber Music No. 4
 1962 – Five Epigramms
 1966 – Five conversations for two shakuhachi
 1967 – Five metamorphic strata
 1972 – Contradiction
 1972 – Contradiction II
 1976 – Hanafuda denki

Instrumental
 1951 – Sonata da camera for piano
 1952 – Partita for flute
 1954 – Alpha and Beta, for piano 
 1964 – Five pieces for shakuhachi 
 1967 – Eight parables for piano
 1970 – Les farces, for violin 
 1972 – Sinfonia for S.M., for sanjugen
 1978 – Fantasie and Fugue for organ

Tape
 1956 – Seven variations (collaboration with Toshiro Mayuzumi)
 1958 – Transfiguration
 1962 – Variété
 1968 – Small confession

Sources

Further reading
Ishii, Maki. 1983. "Japan's 'Music of Encounter': Historical Background and Present Role". The World of Music 25, No. 1 (Japan): 80–90.
Loubet, Emmanuelle. 1997. "The Beginnings of Electronic Music in Japan, with a Focus on the NHK Studio: The 1950s and 1960s", translated from the French by Curtis Roads, with assistance from Brigitte Robindoré. Computer Music Journal 21, No. 4 (Winter): 11–22.
Loubet, Emmanuelle. 1998. "The Beginnings of Electronic Music in Japan, with a Focus on the NHK Studio: The 1970s". Computer Music Journal 22, No. 1 (Spring): 49–55.

1930 births
2013 deaths
20th-century classical composers
20th-century Japanese composers
21st-century classical composers
21st-century Japanese composers
Japanese classical composers
Japanese male classical composers
Japanese opera composers
Male opera composers
Musicians from Tokyo
Tokyo University of the Arts alumni
20th-century Japanese male musicians
21st-century Japanese male musicians